Alpesh Vallabhdas Vadher (born 7 September 1974) is a former Kenyan cricketer of Indian origin. He is a right-handed batsman.

Having made 42 on his debut against Bangladesh in 1997, he did little more until the 1999 Cricket World Cup, in which he made two fifties, including an unbeaten 73 against Sri Lanka.

He retired in the year 2000, but was called back by the team in time for the 2003 Cricket World Cup along with Aasif Karim, the former Kenyan captain.

He retired for a second and final time following the close of the World Cup.

After cricket
After leaving cricket he married Shital Vadher, and is currently working for PKF in Kenya where he is a partner.

In 2012, Vadher was appointed as the chairman of their newly constituted selection panel by Cricket Kenya.

References

Birth of the one-day final

1974 births
Living people
Kenyan cricketers
Kenya One Day International cricketers
Cricketers at the 1998 Commonwealth Games
Cricketers at the 1999 Cricket World Cup
Kenyan Hindus
Kenyan people of Indian descent
Commonwealth Games competitors for Kenya